Aegolytoceras is an extinct genus of cephalopod belonging to the Ammonite subclass.

References

Early Jurassic ammonites
Fossils of Italy